Veevers crater is an impact crater located on a flat desert plain between the Great Sandy and Gibson Deserts in  the center of the state of Western Australia. The site is very remote and difficult to visit. The crater was discovered from the air in July 1986 during a  government geological survey and named in honor of Australian geologist John Veevers who had worked in the area in  the late 1970s. At the time of discovery a meteorite impact origin was suspected, but could not be  proven. The subsequent discovery of iron meteorite fragments around the crater by E.M.  and C.S. Shoemaker in 1987 removed any doubt about its origin.

Description 
The crater has a symmetrical bowl-shaped topography and is considered to be one of the best preserved small meteorite craters on Earth. Based on cosmogenic nuclide exposure dating of the crater walls, the crater is less than 20 thousand years old, while the pristine state of preservation of the ejecta has been used to suggest that it may in fact be less than 4 thousand years old.

The iron meteorite fragments collected around the crater are classified as a coarse octahedrite belonging to chemical class IIAB; the fragments show considerable evidence of deformation presumably related to the impact explosion.

See also  

 3689 Yeates

References 

Impact craters of Western Australia
Pleistocene impact craters
Pleistocene Australia